The Rank Deluxe are a South East London band, notable for their live shows.  They play a style of music they describe as "sewage", which is a mixture of punk, indie-rock and reggae.  Their name is a direct quote from a glamour model Dyer and Buchanan encountered in a strip-club, who claimed the place to be "so rank deluxe", meaning it was the best of the worst.

In early 2006 they signed a recording contract with Fat Cat Records, and released three singles on limited 7" vinyl; the first being a double-A release of "Doll Queue" and "Come On" on 29 May 2006.

History
Lewis Dyer and Richard Buchanan both grew up on a council estate in Thamesmead, where they met and formed a band called The Method, who played a mixture of funk and heavy metal.  Meanwhile, Chris Ballard was drumming in a band called Tested Material with long-time friend of Dyer and Buchanan, Tommy Mizen.  When both bands suffered the loss of members, Dyer and Buchanan auditioned several drummers and bassists, before settling on Ballard and John Wallis in early 2005.  Dyer and Buchanan had already recorded several demo tracks with the members of The Method.

During their time together, the band have recorded a live session with the London indie radio station, Xfm, as well as playing at the Tin Pan Alley Festival on Denmark Street and the opening of Xfm in Manchester.

In May 2008, Tom Battle from the LES in New York joined the band replacing Lewis Dyer as lead guitarist, and co-vocalist.  However, Battle was soon after deported back to the US and his position in the band is currently unknown.  Drummer Chris Ballard left the band in August 2008 to pursue other interests. He is now a music teacher. Shortly after, Spanish-American drummer Q joined The Rank Deluxe. Q originally came to London for a month, but at the last minute decided to take his cymbals just in case, then met the band with whom he is now a full member.

Releases

Singles

"Doll Queue" / "Come On", 29 May 2006
"Style" / "What Do You Want", 24 July 2006
"Poor Man's Cab" / "End in Mind", 28 August 2006, all on 7" vinyl with Fat Cat Records.
"Tightrope" 25 February 2008

Albums

"You Decide" 30 March 2009

External links
 Official Site
 Their MySpace Profile
 Artist page on the Fat Cat website

English punk rock groups